The history of school and office products brand Westcott dates back to 1872, when Henry Westcott, together with his two sons Charles and Frank Westcott, started manufacturing wooden furniture used by printers and trellis units in Seneca Falls, New York. The company expanded rapidly and became one of the largest manufacturers of desk and school rulers in the world. Throughout its history it remained in Westcott family hands until it was purchased by Acme Shear Co. in 1968, which later changed its name to Acme United Corporation.

Because Westcott was such a strong brand, Acme United started selling dozens of other school and office items, like scissors, pencil sharpeners and paper trimmers under the Westcott name. Nowadays, Westcott sells 60 to 80 million scissors and 15 to 18 million rulers worldwide annually.

History

1808–1871

Henry Westcott was born in Newport, Rhode Island in 1808 where he learned the sash and blind makers' trade. Later, he started his own company together with his brother Edwin and an associate called Hiram Miller to manufacture sash, doors and blinds. After retiring from this business, he moved to Seneca Falls in 1847 to embark in the manufacture of an improved churn and butter pail on which he had secured patents. Also this business proved to be a success, mainly because Henry Westcott invented and built machinery to make the wooden products he sold, while competitors were still making them by hand. In 1868, at the age of 60, he sold his interest in this company.

1872–1893
In 1872 Henry, along with his two sons Charles and Frank, established the firm Westcott Brothers to manufacture a variety of wood specialties. While Charles concentrated on operating the factory and Frank on selling the products, here too, Henry's experience and inventive genius were responsible for the company's growth. When Henry retired in 1890, the company was renamed to Westcott Bros. Co. and expanded into numerous products like toy blocks and other games.

1894–1920

When C. E. and M. R. Jewell joined the business in 1894 it was renamed to Westcott-Jewell Company. At first, the company continued to manufacture a wide variety of products like bicycle-holders, stands and hangers, but they quickly started concentrating on rulers, made in all sizes and finishes, both for office use and for advertising purposes. This marked the start of a flourishing period for the company.

By that time, their products were shipped to all parts of the United States and exported to many different countries.

In February 1907, disaster struck as a big fire destroyed part of the factory. Although the building was equipped with a, for those days, modern sprinkler system, damages ran up to $10,000. Luckily, the loss on building and stock was covered by insurance.

In 1920, the company again changed its name from Westcott-Jewell Company to Westcott Rule Company.

1921–1968
During and after World War II the company continued to produce thousands of rulers and other measuring instruments.

After remaining in family hands for 96 years, the Westcott Rule Co. was sold in 1968 to Acme Shear Company of Bridgeport, Connecticut, which was a manufacturer of shears and medical equipment. The company's 55 employees could hold their job and the products continued to be sold under the Westcott brand.

1969–Present
Acme Shear changed its name to Acme United Corporation in 1971 to better reflect its diversified product mix. When hard times fell upon Acme United during the mid-1990s, the company decided to sell the old Westcott factory and move its production to the lower cost and more efficient facility in North Carolina.

But that wasn't the end for Westcott. It had become such a well-known brand that Acme United started using the name on a wide variety of school and office products such as trimmers, pencil sharpeners, erasers, math tools, craft tools, etc.

Thanks to constant innovation, Westcott continues to bring new products to the market. In 2016, for example, a new scissor for kids, coined Ergo Jr, was launched. These are the first and only scissors developed in cooperation with the United States Ergonomics organization.

More recently, it launched a set of glue guns for the craft and DIY markets. These guns have non-stick internal mechanisms so that the glue sticks don't clog up the machines. Also, the tips of the guns have non-stick color changing coatings. That way, when the tip of the gun is hot, it turns red and users know not to touch it. When it's red, it's also ready to dispense the glue.  And when the tip is cool, it's blue.

Main Products Today

Although Westcott manufactures everyday products, the brand tries to stay one step ahead by improving the materials it uses, such as titanium coated blades or blades with a non-stick coating. Other products have Microban antimicrobial protection to prevent the growth of bacteria on the surface.

Scissors
Westcott sells a wide assortment of scissors. Starting from regular, everyday scissors to scissors with titanium coated blades or non-stick coated blades to use in areas where much glue and paste are used.

iPoint pencil sharpener

Westcott is also known for its line of iPoint electric pencil sharpeners. The original iPoint, the iPoint Evolution, and the iPoint Orbit all won a Good Design Award from the Chicago Athenaeum, Museum of Architecture and Design in the office products category. It's one of Acme United's best selling products. In 2013, for example, the sharpener's revenues reached about $11 million.

Rulers
Westcott sells rulers in wood, plastic, stainless steel and aluminum. Next to regular rulers, the company also manufactures Twist-It flexible rulers that can't be broken and rulers with Microban, an ingredient that inhibits the growth of bacteria.

Other
Other main Westcott products include TrimAir paper trimmers, drafting and measuring tools, erasers, math tools, stencils, and vinyl lettering.

Competitors
The major competitor in the cutting category is Fiskars Corporation. The major competitor in the measuring category is Helix International Ltd.

References

External links
Acme United Corp. Company Website
Westcott Company Website
Fiskars Corporation Company Website
Helix International Ltd. Company Website

Cutting tools
Mechanical hand tools
Office supply companies of the United States
Tool manufacturing companies of the United States